Arif or Aref may refer to:

Arif, a local name for the Rif mountains in northern Morocco
Arif (given name)
Arif (surname)
‘arif, a concept in Sufism, see Ma'rifa
Arif gang